Dotnuvos Geležinkelio Stotis ('Dotnuva' Railway Station') is a village (railway station settlement) in central Lithuania, developed around and named after the railway station serving the neighbouring towns of Dotnuva and Akademija.

Train Station 
After Vilnius-Kaunas-Šiauliai service was discontinued and Vilnius-Klaipėda acquired the status of a fast train, there were no passenger trains stopping at the station. However, after successful campaigning by the local community, the trains now stop at the station on Fridays and Sundays as part of Šiauliai–Kaunas service.

Village 
According to the 2011 census, the village has a population of 65 people.

Demography

References

Villages in Kaunas County
Kėdainiai District Municipality